Manchu chess, also known as Yitong or Yitong chess, is a variant of xiangqi. It was created during the Qing dynasty by the Bannermen and was one of the most popular board games among them.

Rules

Black's pieces are set up and move the same as in xiangqi, but horses, cannons, and one of the chariots are absent for Red. The remaining chariot has the combined powers of the chariot, horse, and cannon. Although Black appears to have the advantage, the lethality of the red chariot can easily lead to an endgame if Black does not play cautiously. The red chariot is believed to be the representation of Solon soldiers who were brave and battle-hardened during the Manchu conquest of China.

See also
 List of Xiangqi variants
 Maharajah and the Sepoys

Citations

References

 
 
 
 

Abstract strategy games
Xiangqi variants
Traditional board games
Chess variants
Manchu culture